The First Drakeford government was a Labour-led government formed after the resignation of Carwyn Jones as First Minister of Wales on 12 December 2018, and the subsequent appointment of Mark Drakeford in his place following a leadership contest. The government was also supported by the sole Welsh Liberal Democrat MS Kirsty Williams and the independent MS Dafydd Elis-Thomas. Drakeford's first term as First Minister is known for his handling of the COVID-19 pandemic.

Between May 2016 and December 2018 the senior tier of ministers were referred to as Cabinet Secretaries and the junior tier as Ministers, from the formation of this government they reverted to their previous titles of Cabinet Ministers and Deputy Ministers respectively.

Following the 2021 Senedd election, Labour was re-elected to a sixth term with Mark Drakeford continuing as First Minister.

Appointment

Cabinet

Deputy ministers

See also
Shadow Cabinet (Wales)
Members of the 5th Senedd
2018 Welsh Labour leadership election
2021 Senedd election

References

Ministries of Elizabeth II
Welsh governments
Coalition governments of the United Kingdom
2018 establishments in Wales
Cabinets established in 2018